Brazil competed at the 1980 Summer Paralympics in Arnhem, Netherlands. 2 competitors from Brazil won no medals and so did not place in the medal table.

See also 
 Brazil at the Paralympics
 Brazil at the 1980 Summer Olympics

References 

Brazil at the Paralympics
1980 in Brazilian sport
Nations at the 1980 Summer Paralympics